Gauri Shankar Verma is an Indian politician, social worker and current Member of legislative assembly for Orai constituency of Uttar Pradesh and member of Bhartiya Janata Party. He is Member of legislative assembly from 2017 elections. Mr. Verma belong to the Koli caste of Uttar Pradesh.

References 

People from Jalaun district
1964 births
Living people
Bharatiya Janata Party politicians from Uttar Pradesh
Uttar Pradesh MLAs 2022–2027